"Friend Like Me" is a song from the 1992 Disney film Aladdin. It was performed by Robin Williams in his role as the Genie. The song is also performed by Will Smith in the remake. It was nominated for the Academy Award for Best Original Song at the 65th Academy Awards and the Golden Globe Award for Best Original Song at the 50th Golden Globe Awards in 1993.

Production
The song was originally designed as a Cab Calloway-style big band number. After Robin Williams was cast, it was retooled as a more comedic, pop-culture-filled song.

ScreenCrush stated that remnants of the previous version of the film can be seen in this sequence:

Synopsis

After Aladdin releases the Genie from his lamp and the Genie considers that he can give Aladdin almost anything within a limit of three wishes, the Genie proves his nigh-omnipotent power to the skeptical thief with an impressive musical number, stressing that he is a friend unlike any other. This song is similar to the use of contemporary references in "Be Our Guest", performed by the enchanted cutlery of Beauty and the Beast, and "A Guy Like You", performed by the Gargoyles in  The Hunchback of Notre Dame. The same happens in the live-action remake.

Critical reception
Spirituality & Practice described it as "the big production number of the film".

In a review of the Broadway version of the film, BuzzFeed wrote that the "seven-and-a-half minute 'Friend Like Me' is easily this season's best production number, and a jaw-dropping athletic feat." NewYork.com wrote "Rarely does a production number receive a standing ovation in the middle of a show, but 'Friend Like Me' [has] them standing in the aisles before intermission.".

In popular culture
In 1995, Alvin and the Chipmunks recorded a cover of the song for their Disney-themed concept album When You Wish Upon a Chipmunk.

Shawn Johnson and Mark Ballas danced the song as a quickstep in season 8 of Dancing with the Stars. Season 18's Week 5 episode was Disney-themed and included a quickstep to "Friend Like Me" by Drew Carey and Cheryl Burke that featured an animated Genie dancing along. The dance scored a total of 28 from the four judges (including guest judge Donny Osmond). It was also danced to by Alison Hammond and Aljaž Skorjanec in Series 12, Week 7 of the British version of the show (titled Strictly Come Dancing). Their Charleston to this song scored a total of 27 from the judges.

In 1996 2Pac recorded the song "Never Had a Friend Like Me", which interpolates "Friend Like Me". This song is featured on the 1997 original soundtrack for the film, Gridlock'd.

Ne-Yo covered the song for the 2015 United States version of We Love Disney. An official music video is available online and on the 2015 diamond edition of the film.

Will Smith, as the Genie, performs the song in the 2019 live-action remake of Aladdin, and as a rap in the end credits, with DJ Khaled.

Charts
Will Smith version

Certifications
Will Smith version

References

Songs about friendship
1992 singles
1992 songs
Songs from Aladdin (franchise)
Ne-Yo songs
Will Smith songs
Disney Renaissance songs
Songs with lyrics by Howard Ashman
Songs with music by Alan Menken
Walt Disney Records singles
Song recordings produced by Alan Menken